Wilson v New Brighton Panelbeaters Ltd [1989] 1 NZLR 74 is a cited case in New Zealand regarding interference of goods.

Background
The plaintiff left his Hillman Hunter car parked in his carport, and whilst he was away at the nearby beach, as what had been described as a cruel hoax, an unknown person arranged for New Brighton Panelbeaters to tow the car away. The car was never recovered.

The plaintiff sued for damages for trespass, as well as for conversion.

Held
Judgment for the plaintiff.

References

High Court of New Zealand cases
New Zealand tort case law
1988 in New Zealand law
1988 in case law